Pilipinas Got Talent (PGT) is a Philippine reality talent competition show on ABS-CBN that began on February 20, 2010, replacing The Singing Bee: Season 5 & Pinoy Big Brother (PBB): Double Up (Season 5) and replaced by Twist and Shout on July 3, 2010. It is based on the Got Talent franchise, a British TV format conceived and owned by Simon Cowell's SYCO company.  "Pilipinas" is the Filipino word for Philippines. Anyone can join and showcase their talents in the audition. At the sound of four (three; from season 1–4) buzzers from the judges, the auditionees are asked to stop their act. With at least three (two; from season 1–4) yes from the judges, they are automatically in the list for Judges Cuts, where judges have to pick only 36 acts that will move to the semi-finals. Acts will compete against each other in order to gain the audience support to win the prize money and the title of Pilipinas Got Talent.

ABS-CBN acquired the Got Talent franchise, advertising it as "the first nationwide talent reality show in the Philippines," although other talent shows from other networks are aired with a similar format, such as Talentadong Pinoy on TV5.

Viewers are able to join through text and online registration via Internet. Auditions are held in key cities such as Manila, Baguio, Batangas, Cebu, Davao and Cagayan de Oro.

The first season premiered on February 20, 2010, on ABS-CBN and ended on June 13, 2010. A second and a third season aired back to back in 2011.  The fourth season aired in 2013, with the fifth one airing two and a half years later in 2016. The sixth season started airing on January 6, 2018.

To date, there have been six winners: Jovit Baldivino, Marcelito Pomoy, the Maasinhon Trio, Roel Manlangit, the Power Duo, and Kristel de Catalina. The first four are singing acts while the latter two are interpretative dance acts. The winner of each season receives ₱2,000,000.00.

On May 14, 2015, Filipino shadow play group El Gamma Penumbra who appeared in the third season of the national franchise as a finalist was declared the Grand Winner of the very first season of Asia's Got Talent making them the first winner of the Asian Got Talent franchise. The show ended on April 29, 2018, and was replaced by Your Face Sounds Familiar Kids.

Overview

Auditions

Pre-auditions
This is the first stage of the competition. Major auditions were held in key cities in the Philippines. Since the second season, aside from the major auditions, there are mini-auditions where it can be held in several provinces and cities in the Philippines and judged by the staff of Pilipinas Got Talent. This round is held several months before the judges' audition. Contestants are also allowed to audition online by submitting their audition video through the Pilipinas Got Talent's official website. Acts that have made it through this stage then audition in front of the judges and a live audience.

Live auditions
Following the pre-auditions, acts audition in front of (as of 2016) four celebrity judges. The judges may end an act's performance early by pressing their red buzzer, which lights up their corresponding X above the stage. If an act receives X's from all judges, they must stop their performance. In addition, large audiences have also been a factor in the judging process, as their reaction to an act's performance may swing or influence a judge's vote. This makes the audience the so-called "fifth" ("fourth", from seasons 1–4) judge. From seasons 1 to 4, voting worked on a majority-of-two basis where two positive votes were required. Starting from season 5, voting works on a majority-of-three basis as there are four judges. The judging panel give an act a "Yes" if they like them and would like them to advance to the next stage of the competition, and a "No" if they dislike the act and do not wish to see them again. 
In season 5, the Golden Buzzer is introduced. Each judge can press the Golden Buzzer only once per season. Any act on whom the Golden Buzzer is used will automatically advance to the live semi-finals. The hosts were given the power to press it on the 6th season.

Judges' cull
At the end of the live auditions round, the acts that have passed will move on to this round. In this round, the judges will deliberate all the acts who passed the auditions. In the end, only twenty-eight acts will be selected to enter the live semi-finals.

Semifinals
After judges deliberate the 28 acts in the judges cull, each act will then go to a battle of talents, wherein six acts only will qualify for the grand finals.

Grand finals
The acts that managed to pass through the first four eliminations (three in the first three seasons) will compete on a live grand finale event for a final performance in the show. This time, the winner will be up to the hands of the public as the grand winner will be announced as the act with the most number of public votes. The grand winner will receive a total amount of ₱2,000,000.00 (approximately £28,000.00/€32,000.00/US$39,000.00 as of 2018) while the second and third placers will receive ₱100,000.00 (approximately £1,400.00/€1,600.00/US$1,950.00 as of 2018) each. Nevertheless, those who were not able to reach the top 3, will receive a cash prize of ₱50,000.00 (approximately £700.00/€800.00/US$975.00 as of 2018) each.

Seasons

Seasons summary

^  Ai-Ai delas Alas was not able to attend the fifth semifinal week due to illness. Due to this, Vice Ganda was asked to take her duties, but only as a replacement judge for the week.

Season details

Season 1 (2010)

The first season began on February 20, 2010. It was held in some major cities in the Philippines like Baguio, Batangas, Cebu, Cagayan de Oro, Davao, and Metro Manila where the hopefuls are judged by judges Ai-Ai delas Alas, Kris Aquino and Freddie "FMG" Garcia. From thousands who auditioned, 220 acts made it to the Judges' Cull where the top 36 semi-finalists were selected.

The semi-finals were held on AFP Theater in Camp Aguinaldo from the first to fourth performance night and in Tanghalang Pasigueño from fifth to sixth performance night. On the other hand, the results show always held in Dolphy Theater in ABS-CBN. On June 12 and 13, 2010 the season ended in Araneta Coliseum of Quezon City, Metro Manila where the twelve acts competed.

Season 2 (2011)

The second season premiered on February 26, 2011, replacing Star Circle Quest and Star Power respectively. Ai-Ai delas Alas, Kris Aquino, and Freddie Garcia reprised their judging duties from first season. Same with the hosts, Billy Crawford and Luis Manzano who was joined by Nikki Gil. The major auditions for the second season were held in Dagupan, Batangas, Naga, Cebu, Davao and Metro Manila. It is also the season where they held micro-auditions in other cities and provinces in the Philippines where hopefuls are judged by the Pilipinas Got Talent staff.

There are 174 acts who passed the auditions and made it to the Judges' Cut. The Luzon and Visayas auditionees where selected in Dolphy Theater in Quezon City where 26 acts made it to the semi-finals. On the other hand, the remaining 10 acts from Mindanao were visited by the judges in their respective hometown. The semi-finals were held in PAGCOR Theater in Parañaque City. In addition, there is a wildcard round for those semi-finalists who made it to the top three highest audience votes but lost the judges' votes are given a chance to compete again in order to make it to the grand finals. Only two will be chosen for this round.

On June 25 and 26, 2011, the season ended in Araneta Coliseum of Quezon City, Metro Manila where the fourteen acts competed.

Season 3 (2011)

The hosts announced in the grand finals of Season 2 that the show will return again within two weeks. The third season premiered last July 9, 2011, on ABS-CBN. Major auditions are held in Baguio, Manila, Batangas, Cebu, Bacolod, Tacloban, Iloilo, Cagayan de Oro, Davao, and General Santos. There are also mini-auditions held in almost 70 municipalities and cities in the country. In addition, there are online auditions where participants are asked to upload their videos in Pilipinas Got Talent website. In this season, Luis Manzano and Billy Crawford became a judge substitute for a while of Aiai Delas Alas and Kris Aquino, respectively.

After the nationwide auditions (including online auditions), 187 acts made it to the next round called "The Judges Cull" where the judges were able to make a review of the contenders who passed the auditions which they are going to choose the top 36 semi-finalists. The Judges' Cull was held in ABS-CBN Studios in Quezon City where 24 acts from Luzon and Mindanao made it to the semi-finals. In addition, the 12 acts from Visayas were visited by the judges as well as Billy Crawford and Luis Manzano in their respective hometowns.

On October 23 and 24, 2011, the season ended in the Ynares Sports Complex in Antipolo, Rizal where the twelve acts competed.

Season 4 (2013)

A teaser for the fourth season were aired after results night of The X Factor Philippines on July 29, 2012. Major auditions were held in key cities like Quezon City, Bacolod, General Santos, Cebu, Cagayan de Oro, and Davao City.  In addition, winners of TFCkat, an international competition made by The Filipino Channel which is held in Filipino key areas all over the world, were also given slots for auditions in the Philippines. The show premiered on February 16, 2013.

After the nationwide auditions, 104 acts made it to the Judges Cull where the three judges made a review of their auditions in order to determine the top 36 quarterfinalists. This is the season which marks the introduction of semifinal round where the top 12 acts who won the quarterfinals will compete for the six slots in the grand finals.

On June 1 and 2, 2013, the season ended in PAGCOR Grand Theater in Parañaque, Metro Manila where six acts vied for the grand prize of ₱2,000,000.00 (about £31,100, €36,400, US$47,300). Roel Manlangit, a 13-year-old singer from Valencia, Bukidnon, was hailed as the winner of the fourth season.

Season 5 (2016)

On May 17, 2015, in ASAP 20, Luis Manzano confirmed that the show will return for its fifth season and particularly be returning as host as well, following the success of the four Filipino acts who competed in the grand finals of Asia's Got Talent. Two of those acts were formerly part of this show and these are: singer Gerphil Geraldine "Fame" Flores, who competed in Season 1 but lost the judges' vote in the 4th semifinal week, and shadow play group El Gamma Penumbra, who competed in Season 3 but placed 4th in the finals. Flores placed third while El Gamma was declared the winner of the first season of the said regional franchise of Got Talent. On January 8, 2016, ABS-CBN announced that Garcia would return as judge for the fifth consecutive season, Ai-Ai de las Alas will not return due to her transfer to GMA Network after her contract expired and 16 years of association, while Kris Aquino cited her health problems. Therefore, numerous teasers are being released prior to the change of the lineup and two weeks leading to the premiere, actress Angel Locsin, actor Robin Padilla, and comedian Vice Ganda will be joining the judging panel.  The season will premiere on January 23, 2016, replacing the weeknight slots of second season of Your Face Sounds Familiar, however, the filler movie block Kapamilya Weekend Specials filled the vacated timeslot of the aforementioned show. The grand finale was held on May 21 and 22, 2016 at the SM Mall of Asia Arena, Pasay, where dancesport duo Power Duo became the first non-singing act to win the show. Power Duo hailed as PGT season 5 grand winner, winning ₱2,000,000.00 (about £29,500, €38,100, US$42,750) cash.

Season 6 (2018)

The sixth season of Pilipinas Got Talent premiered on January 6, 2018. On June 3, 2017, Billy Crawford announced that there will be auditions for this season on It's Showtime. A teaser was shown during the commercial break of It's Showtime and I Can Do That. Manzano cannot return to host the program due to I Can See Your Voice and was replaced by Toni Gonzaga. Garcia failed to appear on all the liveshows due to the death of his wife. The Grand Finale, so called "The Greatest Showdown", will be held on April 28 and 29 at the Bren Z. Guiao Convension Center & Sports Complex at San Fernando, Pampanga, where Kristel de Catalina became the second non-singing act to win the show. Kristel de Catalina hailed as PGT season 6 grand winner, winning ₱2,000,000.00 (about £28,100, €31,900, US$38,700) cash and a vacation package from 2GO Travel.

In March 2020, the season was re-aired until the network was shut down as part of ABS-CBN's programming changes due to the Enhanced community quarantine in Luzon

Season 7 (2023)
Prior to the semi-finals of the sixth season, auditions for seventh season has been announced meaning that there will be a new season. Due to ABS-CBN shutdown and ongoing COVID-19 pandemic, it caused delays for schedules of pre-auditions and live auditions. On November 24, 2022, it was announced during the TV5 Trade Launch 2022 that the program has been renewed for its seventh season after a five-year hiatus. For the first time, the show will air on TV5 along with Kapamilya Channel and A2Z. This is also the first time that the program will not air on the main ABS-CBN after the network was issued a cease and desist order from the National Telecommunications Commission on May 5, 2020, due to the lapse of its broadcast franchise.

Hosts

Initially, Pilipinas Got Talent was supposed to be hosted by Kris Aquino, but was later moved to the judging panel and the tandem of Billy Crawford and Luis Manzano became the hosts of the show until the fifth season. Marc Abaya hosted the daily spin-off, Pilipinas Got More Talent only in the first season. Actresses Iya Villania and Nikki Gil have served as guest hosts. In season 6, Manzano will be replaced by Toni Gonzaga as host, joining Crawford.

Judges

Since season 1 until season 4, the judges of the show consists of Kris Aquino, who was earlier tapped for the hosting gig, backed out from judging at first. However, she announced at an episode on Showbiz News Ngayon that she has resumed her judging duties. She joins former ABS-CBN President and COO Freddie M. Garcia, and Comedy Queen Ai-Ai delas Alas. In season 3, Luis Manzano and Billy Crawford served as guest judges, temporary replacing Ai-Ai delas Alas and Kris Aquino as respectively during the auditions. Comedian Vice Ganda replaced Ai-Ai delas Alas during one of the quarterfinal in season 4.

In season 5, the judging panel has been changed. Ai-Ai delas Alas and Kris Aquino did not return to the judging panel. Delas Alas did not return due to her transfer to GMA Network, while Aquino cited her health problems. ABS-CBN board member Freddie M. Garcia confirmed his return as judge. On January 8, 2016, a teaser during FPJ's Ang Probinsyano revealed that actress Angel Locsin will be one of the judges. On January 9, 2016, a teaser during It's Showtime revealed that actor Robin Padilla will join Garcia and Locsin in the judging panel and on January 10, 2016, Vice Ganda was revealed to be the last judge that will join the other three during ASAP.

In the grand finals of season 5, host Luis Manzano and Billy Crawford announced that the show will have its sixth season. In the recent teasers released by ABS-CBN, it showed every judges from season 5 in each teasers together with Got Talent creator Simon Cowell, Vice Ganda is the first judge to be revealed, followed by Angel Locsin in the next day after the first teaser was shown, Robin Padilla coming in third judge to be revealed, and lastly Freddie M. Garcia. All of them are from the previous season and going to return to judging panel this upcoming season. Toni Gonzaga replaced Luis Manzano as host while Billy Crawford resumes his hosting duty.
In season 6, Freddie M. Garcia missed the live semifinals and the finals due to the death of his spouse.

Golden Buzzer
In season 5, the golden buzzer was introduced. Placed at the center of the judges' table, each judge has a chance to press it to send an act straight to the semifinals. It can be only pressed by a judge once per season. In season 6, the host(s) were finally given an opportunity to press the Golden Buzzer (as one) only once during the auditions.

Since the introduction of the golden buzzer, winners of the respective seasons have received it during their audition. Season 6 is the only season where all golden buzzer acts proceeded to the finals.

Color key
 Winner
 Top 3
 Reached the Finals

Regular contestants 
As of 2018, Pilipinas Got Talent has seen five acts who return to audition once more on subsequent seasons. Four of these acts made it through the live shows, which three of them was selected again for their subsequent attempt.

Controversies and criticisms

'Susan Boyle'-like issue
During the first season, Antonio J. Montalvan II of Philippine Daily Inquirer lamented about how auditions, particularly during the ones held in the southern island of Mindanao, reflect the Philippine showbiz culture of denigrating people from outside Metro Manila, who are often referred as "promdi."  The writer narrated about one male contestant from Davao City who he wrote as "a Susan Boyle in the making," but the audience applause was cut short after judge Kris Aquino "wryly commented that to appreciate the contestant’s voice, one should not look at his face but only listen to his voice."

Preference for singers
After Manlangit was declared the winner of the fourth season, many Filipino netizens were disappointed with the show for its preference with singers. The show had produced four singers for four straight seasons, all of whom were males. Many had vented their disappointments on Twitter. One shared that in order to win the show, one must be a male singer with a very sad and tragic background story. Some netizens also recommended to change the title of the show to "Pilipinas Got Singers" and "Pilipinas Got Awa" (Philippines Got Mercy) pertaining much to the winning streak of singers in the show.

South Korean forced to speak Tagalog
In the sixth season of the show, Robin Padilla drew flak from the netizens for "forcing" a South Korean contestant to speak in Tagalog. In an episode aired on January 13, 2018, Kim Ji-wan, a South Korean who has been living in the Philippines for ten years, asked Robin Padilla to help him with his card trick. Padilla declined, stating that the Korean should speak in Tagalog. "Iho, Pilipinas Got Talent. Mag-Tagalog ka kasi magmumukha kaming katawa-tawa kung mag-i-English kami dito para sa'yo. Pilipinas Got Talent. Mag-Tagalog ka, iho." (Son, this is Pilipinas Got Talent. Speak in Tagalog because we will become a laughingstock if we speak in English just for you. This is Pilipinas Got Talent. Speak in Tagalog.)

Viewers quickly turned to social media sites, stating that Padilla's attitude towards the Korean contestant was rude and racist. After being criticized by the netizens, the judge did not express any remorse for his actions. He continued to comment on his Instagram account, with a middle finger emoji, saying, “Ako pa ba ang dapat magadjust sa isang dayuhan na 10 taon na sa Pilipinas? Naku hindi po mangyayari! Never!” (Am I supposed to adjust to a foreigner who has been living for 10 years in the Philippines? That won't happen!).

Objectification of women
In the sixth season of the show, the Playgirls, a four-member girl group, washed a car while gyrating and twerking in their underwear. Angel Locsin pressed her buzzer a few seconds into the performance, later explaining that she did not want men to objectify the Playgirls: "Kaya ko kayo binuzz, ayaw kong ma-objectify kayo. Masyado ako nagmamalasakit para sa inyo para i-go ko 'to at patuloy kayong panoorin ng mga kalalakihan na ginagawa iyan" ("I buzzed you because I don't want you to be objectified. I care too much for you to allow you to be watched by men while you're doing that"). Robin Padilla then asked the Playgirls to clarify if the sultry performance was indeed their choice and if they enjoyed what they did, to which they replied "yes". Padilla then added: "Gusto niyo ba 'yun na mga kalalakihan ay humahanga sa inyo?" ("Do you like it that men admire you?"), to which Locsin protested: "Seryoso ka?" ("Are you serious?"). Padilla then explained that he wanted to hear the performers' viewpoint, wherein they stood by their earlier performance. Padilla then acknowledged Locsin's statements, telling the Playgirls that Locsin—a women's rights advocate—intended to protect them. Padilla then apologized to Locsin.

The Playgirls' performance and the exchange between Padilla and Locsin sparked online discussions about the sexualization and objectification of women. Some netizens agreed with Locsin's position, while others interpreted her opinion as slut-shaming. The Playgirls themselves criticized Locsin on their own Facebook pages after the incident, pointing out her bikini costume when she played Darna back in 2005. Meanwhile, the Gabriela Women's Party commended Locsin "for her firm stance against the objectification of women".

Robin Padilla's sexist remarks. 
In the sixth season of the show, Robin Padilla was criticized multiple times for his sexist and misogynistic remarks.

Semifinals 
During the semifinals, Robin Padilla was severely criticized by the viewers for his unsolicited comment to Kristel de Catalina. During the second week of live semifinals aired on April 1, 2018, Kristel de Catalina, a single mom, performed a spiral pole dance act that received a standing ovation from the judges and the audience. Angel Locsin was the first to comment, stating, "Ikaw ang pinakamabigat na makakalaban ng contestants ng PGT. Kailangan talaga nila mag-level up para makatapat sayo. Sobrang wow." (You are the toughest contestant to beat in PGT. They really need to level up. You are overwhelming.) Locsin was followed by Robin Padilla. "Umpisa pa lang solb na ko sayo eh. Alam mo, 'di ako natakot sa lahat ng ginawa mo. Wala akong naramdamang takot kasi alam kong kayang kaya mo. Perfect yung [form] mo; precision." (I’ve liked [your performance] from the start. I wasn't scared at all by everything you did, because I know you can really do it. Your form is perfect; you've got precision.) The last to comment was Vice Ganda. "Tapos na?" (It's over already?), he asked jokingly. "Tapos na, 'di ba? Thank you so much because you saved the night. Wala. Lampaso yung kalaban. Nilampaso mo yung kalaban." (It's over, right? Thank you so much because you saved the night. You've swept away the competition and your competitors.) Vice Ganda also added, "Lalong nagpaganda pa 'yung simbolismo nung ginagawa mo, 'yung simbolismo na ginagawa mo na pinapakita mo sa buong mundo na ikaw ay isang solo parent. Ikaw ay isang babae at ang isang babae ay kayang umangat at magningning kahit nag-iisa." (The symbolism of what you did all the more made things beautiful, how you are showing the whole world that you are a single parent. You are a woman, and a woman can rise above and shine although alone.) It was at this point when Robin Padilla suddenly spoke to the microphone, exclaiming, "Pero kailangan mo pa rin ng lalaki!" (But you still need a man!) Vice Ganda immediately clarified, pointing to Padilla, "Para sa kanya 'yon. Para kay Robin 'yon." (That's for him. That's for Robin.)

The viewers turned again to social media quickly, calling out Padilla for his sexist and misogynistic remark.

Grand Finals 
Padilla was once again under fire by netizens for his sexist and misogynistic comment made after Kristel de Catalina's grand final performance on April 28, 2018. Padilla commented first, saying, "Kristel, alam mo, 'yung mga ginagawa mo delikado, pero gusto kong malaman mo na kahit isang beses hindi ako ninerbiyos dahil alam ko napakagaling mo, napakahusay mo." (Kristel, you know, what you're doing is dangerous, but I want you to know that no matter how many times I watch you perform, I don't get nervous, because I know that you are so great, you are so talented.) "Gusto ko lang malaman mo na gustong gusto ko na meron sa'yong nag-a-assist sa'yo na lalaki ngayon. Isang malaking bagay na makita ko ang assistant mo may lalaki diyan sa baba, hindi man katabi mo pero assistant mo," Padilla added. (I just want you to know that I really like it that there's a guy assisting you now. It's a huge thing for me to see that you have a male assistant there below; he may not be next to you, but he's still your assistant.)

As usual, the viewers slammed the judge through social media sites. One Twitter user called him out for tagging women as "individuals who cannot live without men".

Awards

References

Notes

External links
 
 
 
 

 
ABS-CBN original programming
2010 Philippine television series debuts
2018 Philippine television series endings
Television series by Fremantle (company)
Filipino-language television shows